The Arizona Daily Sun is a six-day newspaper in Flagstaff, Arizona, United States. It publishes an entertainment supplement on Thursdays called "Flagstaff Live!". It also publishes a monthly magazine, Northern Arizona's Mountain Living Magazine. It was formerly owned by Scripps League Newspapers, which was acquired by Pulitzer in 1996; Lee Enterprises acquired Pulitzer in 2005.

History
Artemis E. Fay published the first issue of the weekly Peach Springs, Arizona Champion on September 15, 1883. On February 2, 1884, he relocated the paper to Flagstaff. In May 1891, the paper was renamed to The Coconino Sun. On August 5, 1946, the paper was again renamed to the current Arizona Daily Sun.

References

External links
 
 

1883 establishments in Arizona Territory
Publications established in 1883
Newspapers published in Arizona
Daily newspapers published in the United States
Flagstaff, Arizona
Mass media in Coconino County, Arizona
Companies based in Arizona